Pierre Cloarec (14 March 1909 – 7 December 1994) was a French professional road bicycle racer. During his career, he won two stages in the Tour de France.

Major results

1933
Boucles de l'Aulne
1935
Boucles de l'Aulne
Saint-Brieuc
1936
Boucles de l'Aulne
1937
Saint-Brieuc
Paris-Saint-Etienne
1938
Circuit du Morbihan
GP Ouest-France
Marseille-Lyon
Rouen-Caen-Rouen
1939
Tour de France:
Winner stages 3 and 14
Circuit de Douarnez
Criterium du Midi
Marseille-Lyon
Nantes-Les Sables d'Olonne
Paris–Camembert

External links 

Official Tour de France results for Pierre Cloarec

French male cyclists
1909 births
1994 deaths
French Tour de France stage winners
Sportspeople from Finistère
Cyclists from Brittany